The Whole Town's Talking (released in the UK as Passport to Fame) is a 1935 American comedy film starring Edward G. Robinson as a law-abiding man who bears a striking resemblance to a killer, with Jean Arthur as his love interest. It was directed by John Ford from a screenplay by Jo Swerling and Robert Riskin based on a story by W.R. Burnett originally published in Collier's in August 1932.  Burnett was also the author of the source material for Robinson's screen break-through, Little Caesar. The film The Whole Town's Talking (1926) has no story connection to this film.

Plot
Meek and mild Arthur Ferguson Jones and brash Wilhelmina Clark work at the same advertising firm. He harbors a secret crush on her while she barely knows he exists.

Jones turns out to look exactly like the notorious bank robber "Killer" Mannion and is apprehended by the police. After his true identity is confirmed, the district attorney gives Jones a "passport," a letter identifying him as not Mannion, so that he can avoid the same trouble in the future. Jones becomes a local celebrity and, at the behest of his boss, begins ghost-writing Mannion's "autobiography" in the newspaper, with good-natured but street-wise "Miss Clark" (as he refers to her) voluntarily acting as his agent to see that he gets paid.

Mannion decides to take advantage of his mild-mannered doppelgänger and, ultimately, leave Jones "holding the bag" for Mannion's crimes. He kidnaps Wilhelmina, Jones' visiting aunt, and his manager from work, and takes them back to his hideout. He instructs Jones to make a large deposit for Mannion's mother's benefit at the First National Bank, and then has a henchman phone the police and tell them that he (Mannion) is about to rob the bank. But Mannion's plan fails when Jones forgets to bring the check and unwittingly leads the police back to Mannion's hideout.

Upon his arrival, Jones is mistaken for Mannion by the waiting henchmen and quickly realizes that he is meant to be the fall guy. When the real Mannion returns unexpectedly, his gang thinks he is Jones and machine-guns him to death. The police arrive in time to capture the rest of the gang and release the captives. With Mannion dead, Jones collects a reward and takes a long-desired cruise to Shanghai with Wilhelmina.

Cast
 Edward G. Robinson as Arthur Ferguson Jones and "Killer" Mannion
 Jean Arthur as Wilhelmina Clark
 Arthur Hohl as Detective Sergeant Boyle
 James Donlan as Detective Sergeant Howe
 Arthur Byron as Spencer, District Attorney
 Wallace Ford as Healy, Record reporter
 Etienne Girardot as Seaver, office manager
 Donald Meek as Hoyt
 Edward Brophy as "Slugs" Martin (as Ed Brophy)
 Paul Harvey as "J.G." Carpenter

Cast notes
 In his autobiography, All My Yesterdays, Edward G. Robinson wrote of Jean Arthur, "She was whimsical without being silly, unique without being nutty, a theatrical personality who was an untheatrical person. She was a delight to work with and to know."
 Lucille Ball has a small uncredited part as a bank employee, and Francis Ford, director John Ford's older brother, appears as a newspaper reporter at the dock.

Production
The Whole Town's Talking – which had the working titles of "Jail Breaker" and "Passport to Fame" – was in production from October 24 to December 11, 1934.  The film incorporated some footage originally shot for Columbia's 1931 film The Criminal Code.

Columbia Pictures borrowed Edward G. Robinson for this film from Warner Bros. – Robinson heard about the transactions through gossip columnist Louella Parsons.  At the time Robinson's career was somewhat moribund and the star was tired of playing only gangsters.  He was initially opposed to the project but changed his mind after reading the script. In retrospect The Whole Town's Talking has been seen as a turning point for Robinson, reviving his cinematic fortunes.  Along with 1933's The Little Giant and 1938's A Slight Case of Murder, it was one of the few comedies Robinson made.

W.R. Burnett, who wrote the story that The Whole Town's Talking was based on, also wrote Little Caesar, which was the film that catapulted Robinson to stardom, and High Sierra, the film of which was a significant step for Humphrey Bogart in moving from playing gangsters to romantic lead.

Response
Film critic and historian Jean Mitry said of the film that it is "...wonderfully cut and mounted, supercharged, taut like a spring, it is a work of total perfection in its genre." And Michael Costello of All Movie Guide wrote that "Ford directs and cuts the scenes with uncharacteristic rapidity, seeming to enjoy playing off the meek clerk against the anarchic gangster." On Rotten Tomatoes, the film has an aggregate score of 100% based on 13 critic reviews.

References

External links
 
 
 
 

1935 films
1935 comedy films
1930s crime comedy films
American black-and-white films
American crime comedy films
Columbia Pictures films
Films based on works by W. R. Burnett
Films directed by John Ford
Films with screenplays by Robert Riskin
Films with screenplays by Jo Swerling
Films scored by Louis Silvers
1930s English-language films
1930s American films